CVL-871 is a dopamine receptor agonist which is under development for the treatment of dementia-related apathy. It was originated by Pfizer and is under development by Cerevel Therapeutics. CVL-871 acts as a selective partial agonist of the dopamine D1 and D5 receptors. It is taken via oral administration. As of April 2022, CVL-871 is in phase 2 clinical trials for dementia-related apathy.

See also
 Tavapadon (CVL-751)

References

External links
 CVL-871 - AdisInsight
 CVL-871 - Cerevel Therapeutics

D1-receptor agonists
D5 receptor agonists
Experimental drugs